Shrinking Violet may refer to:

Music
"Shrinking Violet", a song on Mostly Autumn's album The Last Bright Light
"Shrinking Violet", a song by the band Bishop Allen
Shrinking Violet, an album by the band L.A. Guns

Other uses
Shrinking violet, an English idiom meaning a "shy person"
Salu Digby, a character from DC Comics also known as Shrinking Violet
Shrinkin' Violette, one of the children in The Funny Company
Shrinking Violet, a book written by Danielle Joseph, foundation for Radio Rebel
Shrinking Violet, a talking doll similar to Chatty Cathy manufactured in the mid-20th century in the US

See also
Violet (disambiguation)